"Baby, Oh No" is a 1982 single by English new wave band Bow Wow Wow from their 1982 compilation album I Want Candy. The single peaked at No. 58 on the Billboard dance/disco chart in the same year, and also “Bubbled Under” the Hot 100 at No. 103. In addition, the single was accompanied by a motorcyclist, bedroom, and live show themed music video which had some airplay on MTV. The song has also been mentioned in the books, "Pocket DJ", "Life and Death on the New York Dance Floor, 1980-1983", and "All Music Guide to Rock: The Definitive Guide to Rock, Pop, and Soul"

References

Bow Wow Wow songs
1982 songs
1982 singles
RCA Records singles